The Kwansan-ri Dolmen is one of the National Treasures of North Korea. It is located in Kwansan-ri, Unnyul County, one of the many dolmen located in and around Pyongyang.

It is one of the largest dolmen in North Korea, thought to date from the early 10th century BC. The top stone weighs over 40 tons, with a length of 8.75m, a width of 4.5m and thickness that reaches 31cm.

References 

National Treasures of North Korea
Dolmens
Buildings and structures in South Hwanghae Province